Crataegus annosa is a poorly known species of hawthorn that is endemic to Alabama, and first recorded from Russell County there, in the Southern United States of North America.

Taxonomy
In some respects it resembles Crataegus series Apricae, while in other respects it resembles series Lacrimatae.

References

annosa
Flora of Alabama
Endemic flora of the United States
Trees of the Southeastern United States
Flora without expected TNC conservation status